The football tournament at the 1973 Southeast Asian Peninsular Games was held from 1 September to 8 September 1973 in Singapore.

Teams

Tournament

Group stage

Group A

Group B

Knockout stage

Semi-finals

Bronze medal match

Gold medal match

Winners

Medal winners

Notes

References 
Southeast Asian Peninsular Games 1973 at RSSSF
SEAP Games 1973 at AFF official website 

Southeast
Football at the Southeast Asian Games
1973
1973 in Singaporean sport